Venus Williams defeated Marion Bartoli in the final, 6–4, 6–1 to win the ladies' singles tennis title at the 2007 Wimbledon Championships. Williams, ranked 31st at the time and seeded 23rd, remains the lowest ranked and lowest seeded woman ever to win Wimbledon. This was Williams' fourth Wimbledon singles title and sixth major title overall, and she also became the first female champion to earn the same amount of prize money as the male champion, following the tournament's decision to award equal pay for the first time that year.

Amélie Mauresmo was the defending champion, but lost to Nicole Vaidišová in the fourth round.

Bartoli reached her first major final after a semifinal victory over world No. 1 Justine Henin that was described as one of the biggest shocks in Wimbledon history.

This was also the first Wimbledon main draw appearance for the 2018 champion and future world No. 1 Angelique Kerber, who lost to Anna Chakvetadze in the first round.

Seeds

  Justine Henin (semifinals)
  Maria Sharapova (fourth round)
  Jelena Janković (fourth round)
  Amélie Mauresmo (fourth round)
  Svetlana Kuznetsova (quarterfinals)
  Ana Ivanovic (semifinals)
  Serena Williams (quarterfinals)
  Anna Chakvetadze (third round)
  Martina Hingis (third round)
  Daniela Hantuchová (fourth round)
  Nadia Petrova (fourth round)
  Elena Dementieva (third round)
  Dinara Safina (second round)
  Nicole Vaidišová (quarterfinals)
  Patty Schnyder (fourth round)
  Shahar Pe'er (third round)

  Tatiana Golovin (second round)
  Marion Bartoli (final)
  Katarina Srebotnik (third round)
  Sybille Bammer (second round)
  Tathiana Garbin (second round)
  Anabel Medina Garrigues (first round)
  Venus Williams (champion)
  Alona Bondarenko (third round)
  Lucie Šafářová (third round)
  Ai Sugiyama (third round)
  Samantha Stosur (second round)
  Mara Santangelo (third round)
  Francesca Schiavone (second round)
  Olga Puchkova (first round)
  Michaëlla Krajicek (quarterfinals)
  Martina Müller (second round)

Qualifying

Draw

Finals

Top half

Section 1

Section 2

Section 3

Section 4

Bottom half

Section 5

Section 6

Section 7

Section 8

Championship match statistics

References

External links

2007 Wimbledon Championships on WTAtennis.com
2007 Wimbledon Championships – Women's draws and results at the International Tennis Federation

Women's Singles
Wimbledon Championship by year – Women's singles
Wimbledon Championships
Wimbledon Championships